The Royal Military School of Music (RMSM) trains musicians for the British Army's fourteen regular bands, as part of the Royal Corps of Army Music. Until August 2021, the school was based at Kneller Hall in Twickenham, however it moved to HMS Nelson in Portsmouth following closure of Kneller.

History

The RMSM was established in 1857 at the instigation of Prince George, Duke of Cambridge, who was Queen Victoria's cousin and commander-in-chief of the army. In 1854, during the Crimean War, he attended a parade in Scutari, Turkey to celebrate the Queen's birthday, where approximately 20 British Army bands on parade were required to combine in a performance of the national anthem. The custom at this time was for regiments to hire civilian bandmasters, each of whom had free rein in their band's instrumentation and arrangements. With each band playing God Save the Queen simultaneously in different instrumentations, pitches, arrangements and key signatures, the result was an embarrassing and humiliating cacophony. The Duke decided there should be some standardisation in army music, and so formed the RMSM, with Henry Schallehn (who also became the first director of music at the Crystal Palace) as commandant. For several years in the late 19th century, the commandant was Colonel T. B. Shaw-Hellier, owner of the Hellier Stradivarius.

In 1937 the school commissioned a new set of custom-made fanfare trumpets, designed by Lt-Col. Hector Adkins (Director of Music 1923-1941), along with a matching set of valved trombones. First appearing at the Coronation of King George VI that year, the Kneller Hall Trumpeters went on to be a regular feature of state occasions and national celebrations throughout the twentieth century. A distinctive banner, designed for the School by Kruger Gray, was hung from each instrument and made the trumpeters very recognisable: it consisted of a shield displaying three clarions beneath a crown.

Present day
The RMSM spent a century and a half at Kneller Hall, which was the country house of the court painter Sir Godfrey Kneller and was rebuilt after a fire in 1848.

The school is open to men and women whose commitment to the army is for a minimum of four years. The Royal Corps of Army Music, the largest employer of musicians in the United Kingdom, promotes itself to potential recruits as an opportunity to earn a salary as a musician. The school's curriculum is not limited to martial music, but includes jazz, swing, middle-of-the-road, popular, baroque, mainstream symphonic and operatic music.

In August 2021 the Headquarters of the Royal Corps of Army Music moved to Gibraltar Barracks in Minley and shortly later the school itself moved to Portsmouth.

Museum of Army Music
The Museum of Army Music, which was at Kneller Hall for several decades, had a collection of instruments, music, banners, medals, model bands, documents, prints, manuscripts, paintings and uniforms illustrating the history of military music. It is presently, Oct 2021, in storage pending a new location.

Notable alumni

See also
 List of music museums

References

Further reading
Turner, Gordon & Alwyn W. Turner, (1996) The Trumpets will Sound: The Story of the Royal Military School of Music, Kneller Hall. Tunbridge Wells: Parapress

External links

Royal Military School of Music – on British Army official website
Museum of Army Music

Training establishments of the British Army
Performing arts education in London
Music schools in London
Educational institutions established in 1857
History of the London Borough of Richmond upon Thames
1857 establishments in England
Twickenham
Military training establishments of the United Kingdom
Royal Corps of Army Music
Music in the London Borough of Richmond upon Thames